Cao Jianming (born September 24, 1955 in Shanghai) is a Chinese politician who is served as a vice chairman of the Standing Committee of the National People's Congress from 2018 to 2023. Previously, he was the Procurator-General of the Supreme People's Procuratorate of the People's Republic of China.

Biography
He received his LL.B and LL.M degrees from East China University of Political Science and Law in 1983 and 1986.

After graduation, Cao joined the faculty of the same university. He was the President of this university from 1997 to 1999 and became the President of the National Judges College in 1999.

He studied in Ghent University in Ghent, Belgium in Europe from 1989-1990.

Cao was appointed Vice President of the Supreme People's Court in 1999.

On March 16, 2008, Cao was elected Procurator-General of the Supreme People's Procuratorate. He was elected as the Vice Chairperson of the Standing Committee of the National People's Congress in March 2018.

Cao is a member of the 17th, 18th, and 19th Central Committees of the Communist Party of China. He was an alternate member of the 16th Central Committee.

On 7 December 2020, pursuant to Executive Order 13936, the US Department of the Treasury imposed sanctions on the entire 14 Vice Chairperson of the National People's Congress, including Cao, for "undermining Hong Kong's autonomy and restricting the freedom of expression or assembly."

References

External links
 Profile of Cao Jianming, official website of the Supreme People's Court.
 Biography of Cao Jianming, Xinhuanet

1955 births
Living people
20th-century Chinese judges
21st-century Chinese judges
Alternate members of the 16th Central Committee of the Chinese Communist Party
Chairperson and vice chairpersons of the Standing Committee of the 13th National People's Congress
Chinese Communist Party politicians from Shanghai
Delegates to the 12th National People's Congress
East China University of Political Science and Law alumni
Ghent University alumni
Individuals sanctioned by the United States under the Hong Kong Autonomy Act
Members of the 17th Central Committee of the Chinese Communist Party
Members of the 18th Central Committee of the Chinese Communist Party
Members of the 19th Central Committee of the Chinese Communist Party
People's Republic of China politicians from Shanghai
Presidents of East China University of Political Science and Law
Procurator-General of the Supreme People's Procuratorate
Supreme People's Court judges